Justin Thomas Albert  (born 19 February 1965) is the Director for Wales of the National Trust, Executive Director and Trustee of the International National Trust Organization (INTO) advisor to the Minister for Economy and Transport, Vice President of Hay Festival and Member of the Hay Festival Council. He is also a Director and Trustee of Michael Morphurgo's Farms For City Children charity, as well as being appointed Director and Trustee for the Centre for Advanced Welsh and Celtic Studies.

In earlier years he was a multi award winning history and environmental filmmaker and television executive. He is the son of lawyer Robert Alan Albert and filmmaker Revel Sarah Guest. He has a degree in law from the University of Buckingham and an honorary Masters in Arts from the University of Wales.

The National Trust
Albert was appointed Director of Wales for The National Trust in 2011. The National Trust is the largest volunteer conservation charity in Europe. National Trust Wales is the largest landowner in Wales, and it protects numerous castles and historic buildings, thousands of acres of wilderness and farmland, and 200 miles of Welsh coastline.

Albert was appointed Officer of the Order of the British Empire (OBE) in the 2021 Birthday Honours for services to the historic and natural environment in Wales.

International National Trust Organization (INTO)
Albert was appointed as lead director and Trustee to INTO in 2013.  The international charity represents the interests of 64 international heritage and conservation charities from around the globe.

Other
He has been a Vice President of Hay Festival since 2005. He is a Trustee of Hay Castle Trust, and a member of the Welsh Government Tourism Advisory Board.  In 2017 he became Director and Trustee of Michael Morphurgo's Farms For City Children charity. He is also Director and Trustee for the Centre for Advanced Welsh and Celtic Studies, and a founding trustee of the Hay Castle Trust.

Film and television

Documentary film production
Albert was a documentary filmmaker and company director of Transatlantic Films. He has directed and produced over 60 documentaries, including: History's Turning Points (1995); Three Gorges: The Biggest Dam in the World (1998); Trailblazers (1998); Lost Treasures of the Ancient World: Ancient China (2000); China's Mega Dam (2006).

Broadcasting
He was Executive Vice President at Mandalay Media Arts in Los Angeles 1999. He joined Discovery Communications Digital Networks as a Vice President in 1999, and became head of production at Animal Planet in 2001. He founded West Beach Television, an independent production company, in 2003, and in 2008, he became General Manager of Horse and Country TV.

Personal life
Albert married Hester Amanda Jessica Gray, elder daughter of restaurateur Rose Gray, in 1991, and was divorced in 1997. He married Nancy Burns Lavin, a former television executive and building preservation charity director, in 2000. They live in Wales. He has three children, Charlotte (b. 27 March 1992), Oscar (b. 9 March 1996) and Theodore (b. 19 May 1997).

References

External links
The National Trust
The Discovery Channel
Horse and Country TV
Hay Festival
Hay Castle Trust

Living people
1965 births
British film producers
British television executives
Alumni of the University of Buckingham
British documentary filmmakers
National Trust people
Officers of the Order of the British Empire